The Big V is a semi-professional basketball league in Victoria, Australia. The league comprises 12 competitions, with its two main ones being the men's (SCM) and women's (SCW) State Championship divisions. Below the SCM and SCW is: Division One Men (D1M), Division One Women (D1W), Division Two Men (D2M), and Division Two Women (D2W). The remaining six competitions are youth divisions, with those being: Victorian Youth Championship Men (VYCM), Victorian Youth Championship Women (VYCW), Youth League One Men (YL1M), Youth League One Women (YL1W), Youth League Two Men (YL2M), and Youth League Two Women (YL2W).

History
In 1987, the Victorian Women's Conference was introduced for women's teams from Country Victorian basketball associations. It quickly grew to include many metropolitan teams, and in 1989, a men's division was introduced and the competition was renamed the Country Victorian Invitation Basketball League (CVIBL). In 1991, control of the CVIBL was shifted from the Basketball Victoria Country Council in order for it to be run by a separate body. The CVIBL later became known as the Victorian Basketball League (VBL).

In 2000, the Australian Basketball Association (ABA) decided to introduce a Victorian conference and invited the VBL to join. The new elite competition was named the Big V and became the ABA's fifth conference, joining the South, East, North and Central conferences. The ABA ceased operations following the 2008 season, resulting in the Big V becoming independent.

Current teams

SCM
Blackburn Vikings
Camberwell Dragons
Chelsea Gulls
Hume City Broncos
McKinnon Cougars
Sunbury Jets
Western Port Steelers
Wyndham Devils

SCW
Bulleen Boomers
Chelsea Gulls
Hume City Broncos
McKinnon Cougars
Pakenham Warriors
Southern Peninsula Sharks
Sunbury Jets
Wyndham Devils

List of Champions

Notes

References

External links
 Big V official website
 Basketball Victoria official website
 Basketball Victoria Country official website
 Big V history links

 
2
Basketball in Victoria (Australia)
Sports competitions in Melbourne
2000 establishments in Australia
Sports leagues established in 2000